Physcon ("fat") may refer to:
Ptolemy VIII Physcon, a king
Tornadotus, a river